Cambridge North railway station is a railway station located in the Cambridge suburb of Chesterton, close to Cambridge Science Park. The station is on the Fen Line, which runs from Cambridge to King's Lynn. It connects to the Cambridgeshire Guided Busway, and provides an interchange with Park & Ride and local bus services.

The station was approved in December 2013; construction commenced in July 2014; and it opened on 21 May 2017, delayed from December 2015.

It has three platforms: platform 1 on the eastern side of the station serves southbound fast services to Cambridge, Stansted Airport, and London King's Cross as well as some morning peak-time services to London Liverpool Street; platform 2 serves northbound services to Ely, King’s Lynn and Norwich; platform 3 is a south-facing bay serving semi-fast and slow services to London Liverpool Street via Cambridge and Bishop's Stortford.

A few services King’s Lynn to or from London King’s Cross pass through without stopping. All Cross Country services to or from Birmingham New Street and Stansted Airport also pass through without stopping.

History

Proposals
The first proposal for a station serving the north of Cambridge was made in 2003 in the Cambridgeshire and Peterborough Structure Plan, which saw the facility as a means of supporting growth in the Cambridge Sub-Region and of delivering an integrated transport network. A major scheme business case and GRIP 2 study were presented to the Department for Transport in 2007. The station would be located on or very near the site of Chesterton railway station which closed in 1850.

The station would provide an interchange facility with the local transport network including the Cambridgeshire Guided Busway and would offer a public transport alternative for trips to the Cambridge Science Park and new development in the Cambridge Northern Fringe. The business case put forward four options for the facility of which its preferred one was a three-platform station comprising a bay platform on the alignment of the former St Ives line and an island platform on the main line. This option was costed at £15 million and showed a benefit-cost ratio of 3.09.

Progress was slow due to a number of issues including the need to retain Chesterton Junction yard as an aggregate handling sidings and difficulties in relocating rail freight operations elsewhere, as well as funding difficulties resulting from the loss of the Transport Innovation Fund (TIF) support mechanism and regional planning and associated instruments such as the East of England Regional Funding Assessment. Following the demise of the TIF, which led to plans for a congestion charge in Cambridge to be put on hold, Conservative party literature indicated that the station would not go ahead, which prompted local transport group CAST.IRON to propose a cheaper single-platform station in Milton Road as an interim solution. By this time, the cost of a new station had risen to £24m, of which £21m had been expected to be provided through government funding, and Cambridgeshire County Council began seeking alternative options. The Council eventually settled on an approach whereby it would provide the initial capital funding and recoup the cost over a period of time from access charges paid by train operating companies.

In February 2011, Cambridge MP Julian Huppert gave his support to the project along with the leader of Cambridge City Council, Sian Reid. In September 2011, Theresa Villiers, the Minister of State for Transport, visited Cambridge, and discussed the proposed station with county council members, saying that the government was interested in further development of the council's proposal.

Approval
In February 2012, Theresa Villiers sent a letter of support to Cambridgeshire County Council indicating that so long as the station's business case remained positive, it would be included in the timetable for the reletting of the East Anglia franchise covering the Fen Line. A revised business case produced in 2012 found a benefit-cost ratio of 4.5:1. The Council released details of a proposed service pattern comprising four off-peak Up and Down trains per hour and indicated that the planning process would begin in 2013.

On 18 December 2013, Cambridge City Council approved plans for the new station. Works began in July 2014 to extend the Cambridgeshire Guided Busway to the station site. Completion of the station works was scheduled for December 2015, but this was delayed until May 2017 due to Network Rail's desire to minimise disruption to existing services and its resubmission of plans for the station's construction.

On 19 August 2015, Cambridge City Council approved Network Rail's new plans for the station, which were not substantially different from the original plans put forward by Cambridgeshire County Council in 2013. Following Network Rail's intervention, the cost of the station was revised upwards to £44m.

Naming
The proposed station was initially referred to as "Chesterton" or "Chesterton Interchange". Numerous suggestions were put forward for the official name, including "Stephen Hawking Cambridge Science Park" which was supported by Julian Huppert and Daniel Zeichner. In December 2014, Cambridge City Council and South Cambridgeshire District Council launched a consultation to select the name from a choice of four: Cambridge Science Park, Cambridge North, Chesterton Interchange or Cambridge Fen.

On 11 March 2015, councillors at Cambridgeshire County Council voted to recommend to Network Rail that the station should be called Cambridge North. By contrast, St John's Innovation Centre was closer and landowners, including the Crown Estate, had been lobbying to have the station named "The Business Park".

Opening

It was intended that the interior fit-out of the station take place between October 2016 and February 2017. On New Year's Eve 2016, new signalling and a crossover for the bay platform was installed. The infrastructure was authorised for passenger use by April 2017 and the station's opening and first timetabled passenger services went ahead on 21 May 2017. Approximately 320,000 passengers used the station in its first 12 months of operation.

Facilities

The original design for the station was submitted by Atkins; this was revised by Network Rail when it became the principal contractor. Network Rail updated the car park's design to maximise its potential as a park and ride facility.

The facilities comprise a  station building comprising a passenger waiting area, toilets, ticket office, retail and amenity space, and staff accommodation. An overbridge links the building with two  platforms capable of accommodating 12-car trains. The easternmost platform faces the up line of the Fen Line, while the second platform is an island platform with the down Fen Line on one side and a south-facing bay platform on the other. Two relaid freight lines for Lafarge run next to the bay platform.

Interchange facilities are provided in the form of a 450-space car park, a cycle space for 1,000 bikes, new pedestrian and vehicular access from Cowley Road and a  extension of the Cambridgeshire Guided Busway from Milton Road. The Cambridge Cycling Campaign published their proposals for integration of the new station with cycling and pedestrian facilities in November 2012. The cycle park canopy is fitted with solar panels generating 49 kWp or roughly 10% of the station's power needs.

The cladding of the building features a pierced design derived from Rule 30, a cellular automaton introduced by Stephen Wolfram in 1983.

Abbey-Chesterton Bridge

On 23rd December 2021, the Abbey-Chesterton Bridge over the River Cam opened, providing cycle and pedestrian access to the station from the Abbey district of Cambridge and from Fen Ditton. The bridge is part of the Chisholm Trail, a footpath and cycle route linking Cambridge Science Park with Addenbrookes Hospital and Cambridge Biomedical Campus in the south of the city.  The bridge provides pedestrian access the Abbey Stadium, Cambridge United Football Club's home ground.

Services

Services at Cambridge North are operated by Great Northern and Greater Anglia using   and  EMUs and  bi-mode trains.

The typical off-peak service in trains per hour is:
 2 tph to London Liverpool Street (1 semi-fast, 1 stopping)
 1 tph to 
 1 tph to  via 

The station is also served by a single peak hour service between London Liverpool Street and King's Lynn, operated by Greater Anglia.

See also 
Cambridge South railway station, proposed new station in the south of Cambridge.

References

External links
 
 Cambridgeshire County Council - Cambridge Science Park Railway Station
 CAST.IRON (Cambridge and St. Ives Railway Organisation)

Rail transport in Cambridge
Railway stations in Cambridgeshire
Railway stations in Great Britain opened in 2017
Railway stations opened by Network Rail
Greater Anglia franchise railway stations
Railway stations served by Govia Thameslink Railway